The Chicago Marathon is a marathon (long-distance foot race) held every October in Chicago, Illinois. It is one of the six World Marathon Majors.  Thus, it is also a World Athletics Label Road Race. The Chicago Marathon is the fourth-largest race by number of finishers worldwide.

Annual Chicago marathons were held from 1905 to the 1920s, but the first race in the present series occurred on September 25, 1977, under the original name the Mayor Daley Marathon, which drew a field of 4,200 runners. The race has been held every year since, except in 1987 when only a half-marathon was run, and in 2020 as a result of the COVID-19 pandemic. It became among the fastest-growing modern-marathon road races in the world, due in part to its largely fast and flat course which facilitates the pursuit of personal records and world record performances.  The race has achieved its elite status among marathons by developing relationships with sponsors who provide prize money to lure elite runners who have produced American and world record performances. Since 2008, the race has been owned and organized by Bank of America, and is officially known as the Bank of America Chicago Marathon.

The race is limited to 45,000 runners and only runners who finish within 6 hours are officially timed. Those wishing to participate can register after either meeting a time qualifying standard or being selected through a general lottery. Although the race has limited registration, exceptions include elite runners, legacy finishers, and charity representatives. Increasingly, local, national  and global charities as well as humanitarian organizations encourage sponsored participation in the event as a means of fund raising.

History

The first modern marathon at the 1896 Games of the I Olympiad in Greece generated interest in the sport which led to similar races throughout most western countries and across the United States.  While marathons sporadically occurred in New York City and St. Louis, the Boston Marathon had established an annual marathon in 1897, soon to be followed by a Chicago annual race. Beginning in 1905, the Chicago Marathon (organized first by the Illinois Athletic Club 1905 to 1909, then sponsored by the Chicago Daily News after 1910) was held annually, with significant community and spectator support, until the early 1920s.

The first Chicago Marathon was run on September 23, 1905. That first race began at the Evanston Golf Club and finished in front of a standing-room-only paying crowd at Washington Park Race Track. Beginning with a little over a dozen runners, only seven completed the course.  In a stunning upset, a reported 100,000 or more spectators watched Chicagoan Rhud Metzner come from behind to steal a late-race victory from the favored Louis Marks.  With that first race, the Chicago Marathon began an annual run of epic races that continued until the early 1920s, eventually on a revised course that largely resembles today's marathon route. The second year, feet bleeding, Canadian Dennis Bennett won, while a band played "Maple Leaf Forever".  In the early years, runners had their own regimens: John Lindquist from Brooklyn took a commanding lead in 1907 while doing whiskey shots, but by mile 23, he was apparently falling asleep; while, the next year, the French-born Chicagoan Albert Corey had more success sipping champagne. Over the years elite fields included Olympic champions, world records were continually sought, and the marathon continued to inspire Chicago communities and spectators until challenges of the early 1920s sidelined the event.

It was not until the health consciousness of the 1960s that marathon growth gained traction in the public's eyes.  Frank Shorter's 1972 Games of the XX Olympiad marathon victory represented the convergence of many middle-class American ideals. Then the 1976 New York City Marathon, which was the first New York City Marathon to embrace the five borough course, popularized the big city marathon.  As the New York marathon began to grow exponentially in the 1970s, the Chicago Marathon was established as a rival to the New York City Marathon. By the mid-1980s, the Chicago Marathon was ensconced as one of the big four marathons.  During the mid-1980s, it was named America's Marathon/Chicago and opened up the way for appearance payments.  Joan Benoit Samuelson described the Chicago Marathons of the mid-1980s as "The World's Marathon".  The Bank of America Chicago Marathon is an open race with no qualifying time to participate.

The Modern Era Chicago Marathon was founded over the objection of Ed Kelly, Chicago Park District Superintendent who refused permission to run in the parks or along the Lake Michigan lakefront. With the help of Lee Flaherty, the event's founder who operated out of Flair House in the Near North Side community area of Chicago, Chicago Mayor Richard J. Daley's support for the marathon was enlisted.  Although Mayor Daley died, his successor Michael Anthony Bilandic approved the race and got Kelly on board.  Michael Bilandic, a runner, and his wife actually passed out medals at the first marathon on September 25, 1977.  This first edition of the modern Chicago Marathon was called the Mayor Daley Marathon.  Flaherty footed the bill for the first race, which had no sponsors.  He again footed the bill in 1978 when the race was again called the Mayor Daley Marathon. In 1979, however, Beatrice Foods became the first race sponsor.

In the early years the Chicago Marathon was held in August.  It has from its inception with 4,200 runners and 2,128 finishers been one of the nation's largest marathons.  The 2000 running was second only to New York.  The 1979 and 1980 events, however, continued to be gatherings of amateur runners. By 1982, the race finally had sufficient prize money to attract world class athletes.  The 1982 was the first with world class times such as the 2:10:59 by Greg Meyer.  By 1983, the Chicago Marathon had achieved its status as one of America's most important marathons.  In 1984, Beatrice raised the purse to $250,000 ($50,000 more than New York's).  The race had become a legitimate rival to New York and continues to vie for top runners.  The 1985 race was spectacular with Steve Jones breaking his own course record (2 seconds short of the world record) and Joan Benoit Samuelson the 1984 Olympic Champion, two-time defending Chicago Marathon Champion and Olympic Bronze Medalist, Rosa Mota and the fourth place Olympic finisher and world record setting Ingrid Kristiansen.  Benoit set a record that stood nearly a generation.  At that time, it was considered the premier marathon in the United States, if not the world.  Although 1986 had 40 world-class runners among the 8,000 participants the times paled in comparison. Beatrice dropped out as a sponsor in 1987. Because of this only a half-marathon race was held that year and the marathon was moved to the spring of 1988 and attracted Heileman Brewing Company to sponsor the 1988 Old Style Chicago Marathon.  The race resulted in three women who had been passed over for the 1988 Games of the XXIV Olympiad placing in the top positions.  In 1991, Heileman discontinued its sponsorship and both the prize money and performances waned.  In 1992, the race again had no sponsorship, but 1993 brought new sponsor LaSalle Bank. In 1994, the race became the LaSalle Bank Chicago Marathon.  In 1996, LaSalle Bank purchased the Chicago Marathon from Major Events, Inc., who had purchased the race three years prior from Flaherty. In 1998, the race began using transponder timing.  In 2001, when Catherine Ndereba broke the women's world record marathon time, both the men's and women's then-current world records had been set at the Chicago Marathon.

In 2007, Bank of America acquired LaSalle Bank's parent company ABN AMRO North America in 2007 and assumed the race's title sponsorship. The 2007 race made history with the first ever CEO Marathon Challenge. The race featured a special competition among the CEOs, presidents, company owners and c-suite executives of companies with at least $5 million in annual gross revenue ($2.5 million for women). The 2007 race also made history for having three (men's, women's & men's wheelchair) of its four races decided in the final 100 meters in a day of record setting heat. The race was partially shut down early (after three and a half hours) as temperatures rose to an unseasonably hot 88 °F (31 °C), which surpassed both the temperature records for the Chicago Marathon and official Chicago records for October 7. Over 10,000 registrants chose not to run in the record temperatures, while 10,934 people did not finish (many were called after the course closed early for safety). One runner died, over 30 were hospitalized, and over 400 others sought medical attention. Marathon owner and sponsor Bank of America, which had just acquired LaSalle Bank, has denied culpability. Similar hot conditions have been experienced in other city center races. In 2003, London's The British 10K also had extremely hot weather that affected many runners.

The 2020 edition of the race was cancelled due to the coronavirus pandemic, with all registrants given the option of either transferring their entry to 2021, 2022, or 2023, or obtaining a full refund.

Course

The marathon course is a loop course, starting and ending at Grant Park.  From there, the current course winds through 29 of the city's neighborhoods.  The course loop can be generally divided into three sections: North, West, and South. In each of these sections, three of the city's main stadiums are near the course's turning points: Wrigley Field to the north; the United Center to the west; and Guaranteed Rate Field to the south. The city's fourth professional stadium, Soldier Field, is located near the start/finish area.

For the first three miles, runners wind through Chicago's downtown area. Eventually, they head north along LaSalle Street.

Runners are supported by over 12,000 volunteers spread throughout the course including at 20 aid stations located approximate every 1–3 miles.  For runners in distress, aid station volunteers include medical staff and ambulatory services are scattered throughout the course.

Digital timers are positioned every 5 kilometers, as well as the halfway point.

Runner statistics

The Bank of America Chicago Marathon has grown significantly from its beginnings.  In 1905, 20 runners registered for the first Chicago Marathon, 15 actually started the race, and 7 finished. For the first "modern" marathon race in 1977, 4,200 people took part. In 1995, 9,000 people registered, and in 1999, over 29,000 people registered.  The 2001 marathon run on October 7 reached its cap of 37,500, which was instituted after the 2000 race drew 33,171 runners, just prior to the entry deadline on September 19.  In 2003, 2004, 2005, and 2006 it reached its cap of 40,000.  The October 10, 2004, October 9, 2005 and October 22, 2006 races reached their 40,000 entrant caps on August 16, July 14, and May 26 respectively.  On April 18, 2007, the 2007 race run on October 7 reached its cap of 45,000 entrants.  There was a late registration exemption whereby elite runners (marathon times of less than 2:31/3:01 or half marathon times of 1:11/1:21 for (men/women)) could register until September 1 even though the race had reached its registration cap in the spring. The 40,000 registrants and 33,000 finishers in 2003 made the Chicago Marathon the third or fourth largest marathon depending on which metric (registrants or finishers) is used.

The Chicago Marathon has never excluded women.  Historically, however, the women's field has been smaller than the men's. This seems to be the result of older age categories having large multiples of men to women, but the women are beginning to outnumber the men in the 20s age group of the field.

Records
World records have been broken at Chicago five times.  In 1984, Steve Jones broke the world record with 2:08:05.  In 1999, Khalid Khannouchi was the first to surpass 2:06:00 with 2:05:42. 

The men's record was broken in the 2013 race by Dennis Kimetto with a time of 2:03:45. That world record has since been broken, but it remains the Chicago course record.

The women's record was broken in two consecutive years.  In 2001, Catherine Ndereba broke the record in 2:18:47, and Paula Radcliffe surpassed that mark with 2:17:18 the year after. In 2019, Brigid Kosgei won in a world record time of 2:14:04 which is now the women's course record.

Economic impact
Much of the marathon's impact is derived from the tourism industry. More than 10,000 of the runners in 2010 indicated that it was their first visit to Chicago. Of that, 6,000 came from 100 countries.  Due to the travelers, the event increases hotel occupancy rates during the marathon. According to an independent study by the University of Illinois, the 2015 marathon contributed an estimated US$277 million worth of activity to the Chicago economy, equivalent to 1,948 jobs.

Charity program 
Since the charity program was officially established in 2002, more than	106,000	runners	have raised over $207 million for local, national and global causes.

Charity fundraising is now closely intertwined with the event as the runners now raise money for research, aid the suffering and heighten public awareness of different causes.  The marathon offers all registered entrants the opportunity to fundraise for a charity partner.  The marathon recognizes four levels of charities based on the number of participants recruited, and fundraising levels.

Runners can also opt out of the public lottery or obtain a guaranteed place after this has been drawn by choosing to run for an official charity.  The 2016 event had over 170 charity partners, and raised more than US$16.9 million.

Deaths
 1998 – Kelly Barrett, 43, Littleton, Colorado – Believed to be caused by hyponatremia
 2000 – Danny Towns, 45, Edmond, Oklahoma – Cardiac arrest
 2001 – Luke Roach, 22, Seattle, Washington – Collapsed near finish line. Body temperature reached  (heat stroke)
 2003 – Rachael Townsend, 29, The Plains, Ohio – Mitral valve prolapse
 2007 – Chad Schieber, 35, Midland, Michigan – Mitral valve prolapse
 2011 – William Caviness, 35, Greensboro, North Carolina – Believed to have died from cardiac arrest five hundred yards from finish line.

References

Further reading
 Britt, Raymond, "Chicago Marathon: Images of Sport", Arcadia Publishing, 2009, .
 Cooper, Pamela, "The American Marathon", Syracuse University Press, 1998, .
 Suozzo, Andrew, "The Chicago Marathon", University of Illinois Press, 2006, .
 Treadwell, Sandy, "The World of Marathons", Stewart, Tabori & Chang, 1987, .

External links

 
 Chicago Marathon Elevation Profile
 Chicago Marathon Weather History
 Marathon Info
 
 Chicago Marathon at MarathonQuest.com
 archive at Chicago Tribune
 Chicago Marathon at Runner's World

 
Marathons in the United States
Wheelchair marathons
Handcycling competitions
World Marathon Majors
Track and field in Illinois
Annual sporting events in the United States
Recurring sporting events established in 1977
1977 establishments in Illinois
October sporting events